Kuh Dim, also rendered as Kuh Dem, may refer to:
 Kuh Dim-e Bala
 Kuh Dim-e Pain